Neptunea ventricosa is a species of sea snail, a marine gastropod mollusk in the family Buccinidae, the true whelks.

Description
The length of the shell attains 105.1 mm.

Distribution
This marine species occurs off Kamchatka, Russia.

References

 Fraussen K. & Terryn Y. (2007). The family Buccinidae. Genus Neptunea. In: A Conchological Iconography [Directed by Guido T. Poppe & Klaus Groh]. ConchBooks, Hackenheim. 159 pp., 154 pls. 
 Turgeon, D., Quinn, J. F., Bogan, A. E., Coan, E. V., Hochberg, F. G., Lyons, W. G., Mikkelsen, P. M., Neves, R. J., Roper, C. F. E., Rosenberg, G., Roth, B., Scheltema, A., Thompson, F. G., Vecchione, M., Williams, J. D. (1998). Common and scientific names of aquatic invertebrates from the United States and Canada: mollusks. 2nd ed. American Fisheries Society Special Publication, 26. American Fisheries Society: Bethesda, MD (USA). ISBN 1-888569-01-8. IX, 526 + cd-rom pp.

External links
 Gmelin J.F. (1791). Vermes. In: Gmelin J.F. (Ed.) Caroli a Linnaei Systema Naturae per Regna Tria Naturae, Ed. 13. Tome 1(6). G.E. Beer, Lipsiae
 Middendorff A.T. von. (1848). Vorläufige Anzeige einiger neuen Konchylien aus den Geschlechtern: Littorina, Tritonium, Bullia, Natica und Margarita. Bulletin de la Classe Physico-Mathématique de l'Académie Impériale des Sciences de Saint-Pétersbourg. 7(16): 241-246
 Dall, W. H. (1919). Descriptions of new species of Mollusca from the North Pacific Ocean in the collection of the United States National Museum. Proceedings of the United States National Museum. 56 (2295): 293-371
 Deshayes, G. P. & Milne-Edwards, H. (1843). Histoire Naturelle des Animaux sans Vertèbres, présentant les caractères généraux et particuliers de ces animaux, leur distribution, leurs classes, leurs familles, leurs genres, et la citation des principales espèces qui s'y rapportent, par J. B. P. A. de Lamarck. Deuxième édition, Tome neuvième. Histoire des Mollusques. J. B. Baillière: Paris. 728 pp.

Buccinidae
Gastropods described in 1791
Taxa named by Johann Friedrich Gmelin